This is a list of schools in the Borough of Stockton-on-Tees, England.

State-funded schools

Primary schools

 Bader Primary School, Thornaby
 Barley Fields Primary School, Ingleby Barwick
 Bewley Primary School, Billingham
 Billingham South Community Primary School, Billingham
 Bowesfield Primary School, Stockton
 Christ The King RC Primary School, Thornaby
 Crooksbarn Primary School, Stockton
 Durham Lane Primary School, Eaglescliffe
 Egglescliffe CE Primary School, Egglescliffe
 Fairfield Primary School, Fairfield
 Frederick Nattrass Primary Academy, Stockton
 The Glebe Primary School, Stockton
 Hardwick Green Primary Academy, Stockton
 Harewood Primary School, Thornaby
 Harrow Gate Academy, Stockton
 Hartburn Primary School, Hartburn
 High Clarence Primary School, Port Clarence
 Holy Trinity Rosehill CE Primary School, Stockton
 Ingleby Mill Primary School, Ingleby Barwick
 Junction Farm Primary School, Eaglescliffe
 Kirklevington Primary School, Kirklevington
 Layfield Primary School, Yarm
 Levendale Primary School, Yarm
 The Links Primary School, Eaglescliffe
 Mandale Mill Primary School, Stockton
 Mill Lane Primary School, Stockton
 Myton Park Primary School, Ingleby Barwick
 Norton Primary Academy, Norton
 The Oak Tree Academy, Stockton
 Oakdene Primary School, Billingham
 Our Lady of the Most Holy Rosary RC Academy, Billingham
 Oxbridge Lane Primary School, Stockton
 Pentland Primary School, Billingham
 Preston Primary School, Eaglescliffe
 Prior's Mill CE Primary School, Billingham
 Roseberry Primary School, Billingham
 Rosebrook Primary School, Stockton
 St Bede's RC Academy, Stockton
 St Cuthbert's RC Primary School, Stockton
 St Francis of Assisi CE Primary School, Ingleby Barwick
 St Gregory's RC Academy, Stockton
 St John the Baptist CE Primary School, Stockton
 St John the Evangelist RC Primary School, Billingham
 St Joseph's RC Academy, Norton
 St Joseph's RC Primary School, Billingham
 St Mark's CE Primary School, Fairfield
 St Mary's CE Primary School, Stockton
 St Patrick's RC Primary School, Stockton
 St Patrick's RC Primary School, Thornaby
 St Paul's RC Primary School, Billingham
 St Therese of Lisieux RC Primary School, Ingleby Barwick
 Thornaby CE Primary School, Thornaby
 Tilery Primary School, Stockton
 Village Primary School, Thornaby
 Whinstone Primary School, Ingleby Barwick
 Whitehouse Primary School, Stockton
 William Cassidi CE Primary School, Stillington
 Wolviston Primary School, Billingham
 Wynyard CE Primary School, Wynyard Woods
 Yarm Primary School, Yarm

Secondary schools

 All Saints Academy, Ingleby Barwick
 Conyers' School, Yarm
 Egglescliffe School, Eaglescliffe
 The Grangefield Academy, Stockton
 Ian Ramsey Church of England Academy, Hartburn
 Ingleby Manor Free School, Thornaby
 North Shore Academy, Stockton
 Northfield School & Sports College, Billingham
 Our Lady and St Bede Catholic Academy, Stockton
 Outwood Academy Bishopsgarth, Stockton
 St Michael's Catholic Academy, Billingham
 St Patrick's Catholic College, Thornaby
 Thornaby Academy, Thornaby

Special and alternative schools
 Abbey Hill Academy, Stockton
 Ash Trees Academy, Billingham
 Bishopton PRU, Billingham
 Green Gates Academy, Stockton
 Westlands Academy, Thornaby

Further education
 Stockton Riverside College, Stockton
 Stockton Sixth Form College, Stockton

Independent schools

Senior and all-through schools
 Red House School, Norton
 Teesside High School, Eaglescliffe
 Yarm School, Yarm

Special and alternative schools
 Elmbank Learning Centre, Stockton
 Hartwell School, Stockton
 King Edwin School, Stockton
 Kiora Hall, Norton

Stockton-on-Tees
Schools in the Borough of Stockton-on-Tees
Lists of buildings and structures in County Durham